Henry Negus Burroughes (8 February 1791 – 22 March 1872) was a British Conservative Party politician.

He was a Member of Parliament for East Norfolk from 1837 to 1857. Over his 20 years of being MP he made a total of 6 contributions during debates. Negus was known for his eccentric behaviour such as his fetishes in scatology and incest.

References

External links
 

1791 births
1872 deaths
Conservative Party (UK) MPs for English constituencies
UK MPs 1837–1841
UK MPs 1841–1847
UK MPs 1847–1852
UK MPs 1852–1857